Thomas Badeslade (active c. 1719–1750) was an English topographical draughtsman, who worked extensively with the engraver W. H. Toms.

One of his early works was to draw the illustrations for the History of Kent published in 1719 by Dr John Harris. Most of the plates were aerial views of country houses, drawn in the style of Leonard Knyff, a Dutch artist who had worked in England in the early 18th century. Harris was inspired by publication in 1707 and 1708 of two editions of Knyff's drawings of British estates, engraved by John Kip, and decided to attempt a similar work for country houses in Kent. Harris wrote the text himself, and commissioned Badeslade to produce the drawings, of which there were 36 in total. Harris paid for Badeslade to draw the view Rochester and Chatham, and for a bird's eye view of Tunbridge Wells from the south. For the other drawings, the arrangement was that the owner of the estate would pay for the plate to be made, and Harris would pay for the printing. Most of the drawings were engraved by John Kip and the rest by another John Harris (not the author). The history was published in 1719, but the drawings and plates were probably completed several years earlier.

In the 1720s and 1730s, Badeslade produced several volumes dealing with river navigation and canals, such as The history of the ancient and present state of the navigation of the port of King's-Lyn, and of Cambridge, and the rest of the trading-towns in those parts..., a 1725 treatise on fenland navigation and drainage.

It is unclear whether Thomas was the "J. Badeslade" or "T. Badeslade" who is credited along with John Rocque as an illustrator of Colen Campbell's Vitruvius Britannicus, or the British Architect.... Three volumes appeared between 1715 and 1725, and these appear to credit J. Badeslade, who may have been a relative. A small edition of the fourth volume was published in 1739, and this clearly credits Thomas Badeslade and John Roque.

In 1741, Badeslade worked with W. H. Toms on "Chorographia Britanniae or a New Set of Maps of all the Counties in England and Wales". The maps were republished on 29 September 1742, with additional place names. An engraving by W. H. Toms of Badeslade's drawing of Hawarden Castle is reported to have inspired John Boydell to leave Flintshire for London to learn the craft of printmaking.

Other works by Badeslade are known to include a plan of the ornamental gardens at Boughton Park, Northamptonshire and a watercolor of the orangery at Mount Edgcumbe House in Plymouth.

Works

References

Sources

Draughtsmen
English illustrators
1750 deaths
Year of birth uncertain